The Mount Evans Scenic Byway is a  National Forest Scenic Byway and Colorado Scenic and Historic Byway located in Clear Creek and Jefferson counties, Colorado, United States. The byway visits Echo Lake Park, the Mount Goliath Natural Area, the Dos Chappell Nature Center, and Summit Lake Park on its way to the summit.

The byway connects to the Lariat Loop Scenic and Historic Byway at Bergen Park.

Route
The byway begins at the Idaho Springs Visitor Center. Take Exit 241 off Interstate 70 for 1 mile. Stop at the Visitor Center for information, then continue on Miner Street to 13th Avenue which is State Highway 103 and continues on State Highway 5 through a corridor between the Mount Evans Wilderness where it ends near the summit of Mount Evans.

The road was originally planned by the Denver Mountain Parks system to link Summit Lake Park and Echo Lake Park to their lower altitude parks in the foothills.  As originally planned, the road ran from Bergen Park near Evergreen to Echo Lake, and then to the summit, while the road from Echo Lake down into Chicago Creek Canyon was a secondary branch.  From the start, the road was planned in terms of the scenic vistas along the way.  The route was set by Frederick Law Olmsted, Jr., and for a while, between 1915 and 1920, it was to be the primary access road for a proposed National Park comprising much of what is now the Mount Evans Wilderness Area.

There is a park fee charged if using parking lots and facilities along the upper portion of the byway.  Prior to 2012, the Forest Service was charging anyone entering the highway at the entrance to Highway 5. This portion of the byway is often narrow, with sudden dropoffs that have no guardrails. It is typically accessible from Memorial Day weekend through Labor Day, although the amount of access and specific dates vary depending on the weather and road conditions.

This route was designated a National Forest Scenic Byway on July 1, 1993 by the US Forest Service and has also been designated a Colorado Scenic Byway by the Colorado Department of Transportation.

Gallery

See also

History Colorado
List of scenic byways in Colorado
Scenic byways in the United States

Notes

References

External links

America's Scenic Byways: Colorado
Colorado Department of Transportation
Colorado Scenic & Historic Byways Commission
Colorado Scenic & Historic Byways
Colorado Travel Map
Colorado Tourism Office
History Colorado
National Forest Scenic Byways

Colorado Scenic and Historic Byways
National Forest Scenic Byways
National Forest Scenic Byways in Colorado
Arapaho National Forest
Transportation in Colorado
Transportation in Clear Creek County, Colorado
Transportation in Jefferson County, Colorado
Tourist attractions in Colorado
Tourist attractions in Clear Creek County, Colorado
Tourist attractions in Jefferson County, Colorado
Interstate 70